David Wrench may refer to:

 David Wrench (rugby league) (born 1978), rugby league footballer
 David Wrench (music producer), record producer, mixer, engineer, musician